John Oakey may refer to:
 John Oakey (inventor)
 John Oakey (politician)